Bare is the third solo studio album by Scottish singer Annie Lennox, released in Europe on 5 June 2003 by 19 Recordings and RCA Records and in North America on 10 June 2003 by J Records. It peaked at number three on the UK Albums Chart and number four on the US Billboard 200. The album has been certified Gold in both the UK and the US and was nominated for Best Pop Vocal Album at the 46th Grammy Awards.

The album was released with a DVD which included interviews and acoustic versions of songs by Lennox. The Japanese edition of the album features a version of Lennox's 1992 single "Cold" recorded live in Toronto.

Singles
No singles were released from the album in the United Kingdom, though "Pavement Cracks" and "Wonderful" were released as a CD maxi single and a limited CD single respectively in the United States, while "A Thousand Beautiful Things" was released as a radio-only single. No music videos were shot for the songs, but all three singles were remixed extensively and all reached number one on the US Hot Dance Club Play chart. However, the live versions of "A Thousand Beautiful Things" and "Pavement Cracks" were made as music videos instead and the videos were later included on The Annie Lennox Collection DVD.

Track listing

Personnel
Credits adapted from the liner notes of Bare.

Musicians
 Annie Lennox – vocals, keyboards
 Stephen Lipson – keyboards, guitars, programming
 Peter-John Vettese – keyboards, drums ; keyboard solo 
 Steve Sidelnyk – additional rhythm programming
 David Rainger – additional guitars
 Tim Cansfield – additional guitars
 David Sinclair Whitaker – orchestral arrangement 
 Pro Arte Orchestra – orchestra 
 Gavyn Wright – orchestra leader

Technical
 Stephen Lipson – production
 Andy Wright – production 
 Annie Lennox – production 
 Heff Moraes – engineering, mixing
 Tony Cousins – mastering at Metropolis Mastering (London)

Artwork
 Annie Lennox – photographs
 Allan Martin – photographs, design

Charts

Weekly charts

Year-end charts

Certifications

References

2003 albums
19 Recordings albums
Albums produced by Stephen Lipson
Annie Lennox albums
J Records albums
RCA Records albums